The Philadelphia Wings are a lacrosse team based in Philadelphia, Pennsylvania playing in the National Lacrosse League (NLL). The 2018-2019 season is their inaugural season in the NLL.

Regular season

Final standings

Game log

Roster

Entry Draft
The 2018 NLL Entry Draft took place on September 25, 2018. The Wings made the following selections:

See also
2019 NLL season

References

Philadelphia
Philadelphia Wings seasons
Philadelphia Wings